Meopham School is a Coeducational secondary school with approximately 950 students, located in Meopham, Kent, England, UK. The school is non-selective and therefore caters for a wide ability range of students. The school delivers academic and personal success through a traditional curriculum and a focus on the core subjects of English, Mathematics and Science.

The school was rated as “Outstanding” in a February 2019 Ofsted inspection. The report confirmed that the school has improved students’ achievement “GCSE results over the past three years show that pupils consistently make better progress than typical” The inspection found that the school to have “quality teaching, learning and assessment across the school is outstanding” and that, “Leaders have created a purposeful and nurturing environment where all collaborate to provide excellence in pupils’ academic and pastoral learning, development and outcomes.”

It is part of the Swale Academies Trust  which also includes Westlands Primary School, Regis Manor Primary School, Westlands School and The Sittingbourne School.

Students from Meopham School were chosen to form part of a "guard of honour" for athletes at the opening ceremony of the 2012 Olympic Games, displaying artistic creations made by the school to celebrate the event.

References

External links
Meopham School Website
Swale Academies Trust Website

Secondary schools in Kent
Academies in Kent